The A10, also called L'Aquitaine, is an Autoroute in France, running for 549 km (341 mi) from the A6 south of Paris to the A630 at Bordeaux. It is the longest motorway in France. It generally parallels the N10 Route Nationale, but deviates significantly from the older N10 between Paris and Tours and between Poitiers and Bordeaux. The closest Routes Nationale to those sections are the N20 from Paris to Orléans, the N152 from Orléans to Tours, the N11 from Poitiers to Niort, the N150 from Niort to Saintes, and the N137 from Saintes to Bordeaux.

All of the A10 is part of the E-road E05; it is also part of the E50 north of the A11 split near Chartres and the E60 between exit 14 at Orléans and exit 19 at Tours. Most of the A10 is a toll road, but it is free north of the N104, near Paris, between exits 20 and 22 in Tours, and south of the N10 (exit 39), near Bordeaux.

List of junctions

Exits are numbered from north to south.

External links
A10 autoroute in Saratlas

Autoroutes in France